ZoneZero is a website dedicated to photography, founded in 1994 by Mexican photographer Pedro Meyer. It first appeared online when the internet became a public resource, making it the oldest still standing and growing website dedicated to photography.  Robert Hirsch has referred to it as a "top-notch" photographic site.

The site is bilingual English and Spanish and free of charge. It has a curated gallery space with portfolios and slide shows of featured photographers. Anyone meeting certain requirements can submit up to five images to the portfolio. The site also includes a magazine, a monthly editorial written by foundation staff and the founder, moblogs, e-books for download, and a forum.

References

External links 
 ZoneZero website

Photography websites